Teeling may refer to:

In people:
 Bartholomew Teeling (1774–1798), a leader of the Irish forces during the Irish Rebellion of 1798
 Mrs. Bartle Teeling (1851-1906), a Guernsey writer
 Charles Teeling (1778–1850), an Irish journalist and writer
 Emma Teeling, an Irish zoologist and geneticist, specialising in studies of bats
 John Teeling, Irish academic turned serial entrepreneur
 William Teeling (1903–1975), an Irish author, traveller and United Kingdom politician

In other uses:
 Teeling Column, one of the four armed units devised by Seán Cronin for the Border Campaign in the west of Ireland
 Teeling Distillery, an Irish whiskey distillery established in Dublin in 2015